Klimovskaya is a rural locality (a village) in Golovinskoye Rural Settlement, Sudogodsky District, Vladimir Oblast, Russia. The population was 23 as of 2010.

Geography 
Mirnoye is the nearest rural locality.

References 

Rural localities in Sudogodsky District